Borislav Borisov (born January 24, 1994) is a Bulgarian male acrobatic gymnast. With partners Dennis Andreev, Vladislav Borisov and Hristo Dimitrov, Borisov achieved 4th in the 2014 Acrobatic Gymnastics World Championships.

References

1994 births
Living people
Bulgarian acrobatic gymnasts
Male acrobatic gymnasts